Rebekah Sarah Robertson  (born 4 July 1967 in Surrey, England) is an Australian actress, author and activist who has appeared on television and on stage. In 2012, Robertson founded the first parent led peer support group and information hub for transgender kids and their families in Australia, Transcend. She now advocates for transgender kids and has won numerous awards for her work.

Early life
Robertson was born in Surrey, England, but grew up in Hobart, Tasmania with her four sisters.

Career

Acting
Rebekah Robertson began her career with an appearance in the television show, Problem Creek as Min, in 1988. Robertson began appearing in multiple Zootango Theatre Company shows, including Alice in Wonderland as the Queen of Hearts, As You Like It as Phoebe, The Comedy of Errors as Adrianna and A Midsummer Night's Dream as Hermia, amongst others. In 1995, Robertson played Greer in the play Wilful Blue at the Victorian Arts Centre. In 1992, she appeared in theatre shows such as The Legend of the Muse and Jeffrey Bernard is Unwell. Robertson also appeared on television shows Fridge Door and Elvis Was Greek in 1994 and 1995 respectively.

After a move to Melbourne in 1995, Robertson began performing in MTC shows, such as Lady Windermere's Fan and Private Lives. She also made an appearance in the show Queen Kat. In 2003, Robertson was nominated for a Green Room Award for her performance in Humble Boy. She continued appearing in MTC productions, like Boy Gets Girl as Madeleine Beck, All My Sons as Sue Bayliss, Cat on a Hot Tin Roof as Mae and August: Osage County as Ivy Weston. She won a Green Room Award for her performance in August: Osage County in the Best Supporting Actress category. Rebekah Robertson also made guest appearances in multiple television shows throughout the 2000s, including Neighbours, The Librarians, City Homicide, Tangle and Conspiracy 365.

Activism
In 2012, Robertson founded the first parent led peer support group and information hub for transgender kids and their families in Australia, Transcend. In 2014, she appeared on Four Corners in disguise (due to a legal requirement) with her daughter, Georgie (also in disguise), talking about their experiences in court and changing the law. From then on, Robertson and Stone have appeared on The Project to talk about the importance of the Safe Schools Coalition and Australian Story, telling their story. Robertson continues to advocate for transgender children and their families. In February 2016, Robertson travelled to Canberra to meet with politicians, urging them to change the law surrounding the requirement that transgender kids should have to go to court to access cross-sex hormones. Robertson was nominated for Straight Ally of the Year at the GLOBE Community Awards in 2016, but lost to Matt Finnis from St Kilda Football Club.

In September 2019, Penguin published her first book, About a Girl.

Personal life

Robertson lives in Victoria and has two children, Georgie and Harry Stone.

Robertson had to apply to the Family Court of Australia so to help her daughter access puberty blockers, a process she described as being "extremely stressful and a very pathologising experience." After appealing to the Family Court, the law requiring that transgender children and their families should apply to the Family Court to access treatment was eradicated in 2013.

Filmography and theatre

Short film

Television

Theatre

Awards and achievements

References

External links
 Transcend's website

1967 births
20th-century Australian actresses
21st-century Australian actresses
English emigrants to Australia
Living people
Transgender rights activists
University of Tasmania alumni
Actresses from Hobart